Dynastor napoleon is a species of nymphalid butterfly native to Brazil.

Its wingspan is about 125 mm.

The larvae feed on the bromeliads Aechmea nudicaulis and pineapple (Ananas comosus).

References

Butterflies described in 1849
Morphinae
Taxa named by Edward Doubleday